The Simijaca Formation (K2S, Kss) is a geological formation of the Altiplano Cundiboyacense, Eastern Ranges of the Colombian Andes.

Etymology 
The formation was defined and named in 1991 by Ulloa and Rodríguez after Simijaca, Cundinamarca.

Description

Lithologies 
The Simijaca Formation is characterised by a sequence of mudstones, grey and black shales with sandstone and limestone intercalations.

Stratigraphy and depositional environment 
The Simijaca Formation conformably overlies the Chiquinquirá Sandstone, and the Hiló and Pacho Formations, and is overlain by the La Frontera Formation. The age has been estimated to be Turonian, or Cenomanian. Stratigraphically, the formation is time equivalent with the Chipaque Formation. The formation has been deposited in an open marine platform setting. The deposition is represented by a maximum flooding surface.

Outcrops 

The Simijaca Formation is apart from its type locality in the Quebrada Don Lope, found at surface in the north of the Bogotá savanna, in the Tabio anticlinal, along the road Ubaté-Carmen de Carupa, at the western and eastern flanks of the Aponsentos-Chiquinquirá Synclinal, near Tena, south of Anolaima and Cachipay, and between Anapoima and Granada.

Regional correlations

See also 

 Geology of the Eastern Hills
 Geology of the Ocetá Páramo
 Geology of the Altiplano Cundiboyacense

References

Bibliography

Maps

External links 
 

Geologic formations of Colombia
Cretaceous Colombia
Upper Cretaceous Series of South America
Cenomanian Stage
Turonian Stage
Mudstone formations
Shale formations
Limestone formations
Open marine deposits
Formations
Geography of Cundinamarca Department
Geography of Boyacá Department
Muysccubun